Çok Filim Hareketler Bunlar is a 2010 Turkish comedy film, directed by Ozan Açıktan and written and performed by the BKM theater players based on the group's theatre work and television series Çok Güzel Hareketler Bunlar, which consists of an assortment of sketches illustrating comic predicaments related to the summer holidays.

Plot
Nine separate stories intertwine into one comedy on people’s expectations and perceptions of a beautiful summer vacation: the stories of those who are only after love; of those who have to stay at home and fight mosquitoes on summer nights; of those who only go to the sea; of those who cannot appreciate the value of a bicycle - the most beautiful summer gift ever; and of those who are still away at their holiday spot even after they have returned home.

Cast 
 Yılmaz Erdoğan - Müdür
 Eser Yenenler
 
 Şahin Irmak - Kazım
 Büşra Pekin - Hatice

Release

Reception

Box office
The movie was number one at the Turkish box office for three weeks and made a total gross of $6,322,637 in Turkey.

Reviews
Emine Yıldırım, writing in Today's Zaman, states,"The point of this film is obviously to take the TV show and the theater performance beyond its boundaries and supplement it with a couple of cinematic tricks and conventions", and "It’s all good and dandy, with an assured technical polish and upbeat direction", and also the acting is great and the sketches are wittily written by the BKM collective, which has an exceptionally perceptive taste on contemporary Turkish society with its cultural authenticities, yet one wonders if the film brings anything new to cinema except for increasing its regular viewer base. Despite all its vivacity, he concludes, "[the film] comes out early in the season since its light 'summer' sensibilities don’t exactly mix well with the dreary spring showers", and "It’s exactly the type of film that one would want to throw oneself at while enjoying the luxury of air-conditioned theaters while stuffing one’s face with popcorn. Still, it’s worth a watch to lighten up those spirits if you don’t own a TV at home."

See also 
 Turkish films of 2010
 2010 in film

References

External links
 
 

2010 films
2010s Turkish-language films
2010s musical comedy films
Films set in Turkey
Turkish musical comedy films
2010 comedy films